Nguyễn Thị Hiền (born 1958) is the former Spouse of the President of Vietnam during the presidency of Trần Đại Quang from 2016 until his death in 2018. Hiền is known for her philanthropy and efforts in promoting foreign investment and tourism.

Spouse of the President of Vietnam 
As the de facto First Lady of Vietnam, Madam Hiền accompanied her husband in various state visits and hosted first ladies and leaders' spouses in various events such as the APEC Vietnam 2017. She is known for her philanthropy during many natural disasters in Central Vietnam and is also involved in promoting investment and tourism for Vĩnh Phúc province where she and President Quang hailed from.

Personal life 
Hiền is the widow of the late President Quang. They developed a relationship during high school years in their hometown of Vĩnh Phúc and married when the pair relocated to Hanoi. They had one son, Trần Quân (born 1984), who is currently the Head of the State Treasury of Vietnam.

References 

21st-century Vietnamese women politicians
Living people
Vietnamese philanthropists
People from Vĩnh Phúc province
Spouses of Vietnamese leaders
21st-century Vietnamese politicians
1958 births